John Henry Bradley Storrs (June 25, 1885 – April 26, 1956), also known as John Bradley Storrs and John H. Storrs, was an American modernist sculptor best remembered for his art deco sculptures that examined the relationship between architecture and sculpture.

Life

Storrs was born in Chicago in 1885, son of architect D.W. Storrs.  In 1905, he traveled to Berlin to study singing, but he soon decided to become a sculptor. He studied with Lorado Taft at the Art Institute of Chicago, with Bela Pratt at the School of the Museum of Fine Arts in Boston and with Charles Grafly at the Pennsylvania Academy of the Fine Arts. By 1911, he was living in Paris, where he studied with Auguste Rodin and also attended the Académie Julian. He gradually moved from representational sculpture and wood engravings to the machine-like sculptures for which he is best known.

During his time in France, Storrs became friends with Jacques Lipchitz. In 1914, Storrs married the novelist and writer Marguerite Deville Chabrol and started dividing his time between France and the United States. In the 1930s, Storrs turned to abstract painting that often suggested the human figure. During World War II Storrs was twice arrested and imprisoned by the German occupation forces. After being released, he returned to his studio in Mer, France, and worked and lived there until his death in 1956.

Work

Storrs is best remembered for his late-career abstract works, often cast from materials not used in traditional sculpture such as aluminum and stainless steel.  He is responsible for the Ceres sculpture at the top of the Chicago Board of Trade Building.

References

Further reading 
 Carnegie Institute Museum of Art, Forerunners of American Abstraction; Painters: Charles Demuth, Arthur G. Dove, John Marin, Georgia O'Keeffe, Charles Sheeler, Joseph Stella; Sculptors: John B. Flannagan, John Storrs, Pittsburgh, Carnegie Institute Museum of Art, 1971.
 Frackman, Noel, John Storrs, New York, Whitney Museum of American Art, 1986.
 Hirschl and Adler Galleries, Six American Modernists: Marsden Hartley, Gaston Lachaise, Elie Nadelman, Georgia O'Keeffe, Charles Sheeler, John Storrs New York, Hirschl and Adler Galleries, 1991.
 Rutgers University Art Gallery, Vanguard American Sculpture, 1913-1939, New Brunswick, N.J., Rutgers University, 1979.
 Sterling and Francine Clark Art Institute, John Storrs and John Flannagan, Sculpture and Works on Paper, Williamstown, Mass., Sterling and Francine Clark Art Institute, 1980.
 Storrs, John Henry Bradley, John Storrs, Chicago 1885-Mer 1956, Musée de l'Orléanais, Château Dunois, Beaugency, 1987, Beaugency, France, Musée de l'Orléanais, 1987.
 Storrs, John Henry Bradley and Meredith E. Ward, John Storrs, Rhythm of Line, New York, Hirschl & Adler Galleries, 1993.

External links 
Archived, digitized papers at the Archives of American Art
 Storrs and Deville Chabrol Family Papers at Newberry Library
 

Modern sculptors
Académie Julian alumni
1956 deaths
1885 births
Artists from Chicago
School of the Art Institute of Chicago alumni
School of the Museum of Fine Arts at Tufts alumni
American expatriates in France
20th-century American sculptors
20th-century American male artists
American male sculptors
Pennsylvania Academy of the Fine Arts alumni
20th-century American printmakers
Sculptors from Illinois